B. Robert Swartburg (born Barnet Robert Swartburg; July 27, 1895 - December 7, 1975) was an American architect working in New York and Florida primarily known for his Modern and Streamline Moderne architectural style. He was one of the leading modernist architects in South Florida contributing greatly to the development of MiMo Modern style in the post- WWII 40s and 50's. In his 35-year career he is said to have designed over 1000 buildings. Swartburg was also an accomplished artist who painted for pleasure, and executed murals and sculptures to embellish his buildings.

Life 
Born in Bucharest, Romania in 1895 Swartburg immigrated to the United States with his parents when he was a child. His parents, Morris and Esther Swartburg moved to New York from London with their two children Robert and Jeannette in 1900. Swartburg's father was a well-known wood carver, who introduced his son to the craft in the early age.

Swartburg started working early, first at his father's shop, then as an office boy for an architect at the age of 9. To finance his education he worked as a soda fountain employee at a Broadway drugstore, taught dancing and competed as an amateur boxer.

On June 8, 1947 Swartburg married Lilian Kalan Dumas, who worked in music publishing in New York City and is credited for discovering the hit song "It's a Sin to Tell A Lie." They stayed married for twenty eight years till Swartburg's death in Miami in 1978.

Education 
Swartburg studied architecture at the Columbia School of Architecture under Frederic Charles Hirons, Harvey Wiley Corbett and Maurice J Privot. He also attended the École des Beaux-Arts in Paris, Palace of Fontainebleau and at the American Academy in Rome, where he spent a year in Vatican under the Papal supervision of Pope Pius XI.

New York 
In 1917 Swartburg opened his office in New York and design residential buildings at Fordham University, Manhattan, Bronx and Chicago. In 1961 Lawrence Schmitt, president of the Silver Creek Precision Company appointed Swartburg as a head of management team leading expansion of North Orlando.

Miami 
Swartburg came to Miami first in 1925 for three years and then again in 1944 to stay active until his retirement.  He became known for designing luxury hotels and residences such as Delano hotel, the Shore luxury apartments, the Executive, Sorrento hotel and many more. In the 60s Swartburg gets his two major government contracts - Miami Dade Civic Center and Miami Beach c

In 1972 he merged his firm with Grove-Haack & Associates and served as a consultant. According to the 1971 Polk's guide, Swartburg retained an office at the Roosevelt Building (4014 Chase Ave, suite #220, Miami Beach, Fl) and lived in a house he built in 1936 at the address 2940 Flamingo Drive, Miami Beach, Fl. The house features a Georgian door Swartburg carved himself after his search for a knowledgeable plasterer in Miami brought no results.

In 2018 many of the buildings designed by Swartburg in Miami Beach were designated as historical landmarks alongside buildings of such big names as Morris Lapidus, Igor Polevitzky and Charles McKirahan to protect their architectural heritage. Accused of flawed job in the Justice Building construction in 1963.

Architectural style 
Swartburg was one of the leading Modernist architects I Miami, and he began his career in Miami during the mid-1920s. He made his name designing luxury resort buildings and later took on large government contracts, such as Miami Beach Convention Center and Miami Dade Civic Center. The Delano is one of the top hotels in all of Florida and it is also the first hotel in this country with an indoor and outdoor lobby. A City of Miami Historic Landmark, the 53 unit Vagabond Motel is considered an exemplary portrayal of the Miami Modern style for its open-air plan, jalousie windows, geometric designs, overhanging roof lines, and open air verandah with catwalk. Swartburg also designed the Metro Justice Building and the Delano Hotel in Miami Beach.

Shore and Bayside condominium buildings have the appeal of a seaside resort by one of the most celebrated Miami Beach architects with a dramatic entrance of intersecting planes, screen-block boxed windows and angled beanpoles. The atomic age gave rise to a spirit of futurism, modernity and national pride,” according to Paskal.

List of projects 
 Garden Bay Manor, 1939
 Delano Hotel, 1947 - one of the first hotels built after WWII. The hotel was named after President Roosevelt, who kept a suite at the there. The hotel’s deco styling is more provocative than most, with sharp angles, and a towering verticality.
 Vagabond Motel, 1953 - designed in the spacey-futuristic Miami-Modern style, the Vagabond was "an expression of the optimistic belief in the future of this time." The building was restored by Miami real estate developer Avra Jain, who specializes in historic preservation development.  The Vagabond Motel, with its futuristic asymmetry and angularity, was a vision of Miami Modern. Designed in 1953 by Robert Swartburg, today it has been thoroughly reinvented and modernized, with a chic pool scene, high-end eatery and more.
 Bass Museum, 1963 conversion
 Marseille Hotel, 1948
 Metro Justice Building
 Shore Apartments (6881 Bay Drive Condo), 1948 - is one of the signature buildings representing Miami Modern post-war style protected as part of Normandy Isle Historic District.
 Belle Towers, Belle Island, FL 1958 - “A private estate would serve as a better comparison…the quiet seclusion required for refined gracious living is zealously guard- ed by the carefully selected staff of Belle Towers.”
 Miami Beach Convention Hall
 960 Bay Drive, 1950 - is one of more than 200 mid-century buildings designated historic by Miami Beach, granting it special protections from demolition.
 The Executive Apartments, 1959. - "Furthermore, the design genius of one of Miami Beach’s most distinctive architects, B. Robert Swartburg (architect of the Delano Hotel), was represented in the compact but highly spirited architecture of The Executive apartments (1959)"
 Bayside Apartments, 1952 - condo with the appeal of a seaside resort featuring a dramatic entrance of intersecting planes, screen-block boxed windows and angled beanpoles.

Famous buildings

References

External links 
 MiMo/Biscayne Boulevard Historic Disrict Designation Report.

Modernist architects from the United States
1895 births
1975 deaths
Architects from Florida
Miami Modern architecture
Modernist architecture in Florida
Columbia Graduate School of Architecture, Planning and Preservation alumni
20th-century American architects
Romanian emigrants to the United States